The Muskogee Navigators were a Western Association baseball team based in Muskogee, Oklahoma, United States that played from 1909 to 1910. Multiple major league baseball players played for them, including Pug Cavet, Dick Crutcher, Bert Graham and Paddy Mayes. They were managed by George Dalrymple in 1909 and Peck Harrington and Ed Nichols in 1910.

References

Muskogee, Oklahoma
1909 establishments in Oklahoma
1910 disestablishments in Oklahoma
Baseball teams established in 1909
Sports clubs disestablished in 1910
Defunct minor league baseball teams
Professional baseball teams in Oklahoma
Defunct baseball teams in Oklahoma
Defunct Western Association teams
Baseball teams disestablished in 1910